Edgar Giberne (24 June 185021 September 1889) was an English artist and illustrator from a notable Huguenot family. His output was limited to some extent by his short life. He was also a keen cricketer.

Biography
Giberne was born in Epsom, Surrey, England, on 24 June 1850, and was baptised on 25 July that year at St. Martin's in Epsom. His father was George Giberne, who had served as a judge Supreme Court of Judicature, Bombay in the Indian Civil Service. Giberne's ancestors were Huguenots from Languedoc in France where the "de Gibernes" lived in Chateau de Gibertain. George Giberne was from a large family. He had eight sisters and four brothers. His cousin Agnes Giberne was a prolific author of juvenile fiction and of works popularising science. Three of his brothers also served in India.

Giberne's mother was Maria Smith the second daughter of surgeon John Sim Smith. She was twenty-five years younger than her husband. The couple were married in Reigate on 20 July 1846.
 
Giberne was a prodigious artist as a child. He entered Rugby, in August 1864, where he was placed in C. B. Hutchinson's House in Barby Road. In Rugby he showed "a remarkable taste and facility for drawing".

Giberne was a keen cricketer and played for Epsom in 1876, scoring 21 runs against Deddington. He also played for Espom in 1877, when he scored four runs against the Private Banks team, and again in 1878 when he scored 12 runs against Wimbledon. He played for the Old Rugbeians against the school's second eleven and scored no runs in the first innings before being bowled by schoolboy J. D. Yates. He fared little better in the second innings, scoring 1 run before being bowled by schoolboy T. L Lomax. 
  
In August 1878, He played for the Incogniti, a cricket team without any home grounds, in their two-day match against the Gentlemen of Herts at Moor Park, the seat of Lord Ebury on 26 and 27 July 1878, scoring 16 runs and one catch on the first day, and 9 runs on the second. He continued to play for the Incogniti, and batted for them in matches against Oatlands, Bury and West Suffolk, and Middleton, in 1879. He remained a fixture on the Incogniti until his death, and served for a while as a member of the committee of the club.
 
In the 1889 season the Incogniti played 47 matches with 26 wins, 8 losses, and 13 draws. Giberne had 14 innings, had never been  "not out", and scored 182 runs, an average of 13 runs per inning, with a max score of 39 runs. As a team, they scored nearly 14 runs per wicket on average. He was a batsman rather than a bowler and bowling averages were not given as he had bowled in less than four innings, and probably in none, as no records show him bowling out opponents.

Giberne married Caroline Alexandra Buller, the daughter of Lt. Col. James Hornby Buller in the Royal Bodyguard, on 20 February 1884 at the Parish Church in Epsom, Surrey, England. The couple had one child, Harold Buller Giberne (6 February 18858 April 1965) who became a farmer.

Giberne had a studio at his home at 35 Kensington Square. He held a well received private exhibition there in the summer of 1889.

The Meteor states that Giberne caught cold in September 1889, while out shooting, and passed away four days later. However his death certificate shows that he suffered not from a cold, but from acute peritonitis, and died at his mother's house at Woodcote Park, Epsom on 21 September 1889. He was buried at Epsom Cemetery on 25 September 1889. His estate was valued at £2,043 13s. 1d., and his wife was sole executrix.

Three months after his death, the Auctioneers Christie, Manson, and Woods advertised an auction of the collection of paintings and water-colour drawings of the late James Blake which included 20 Water-colour Drawings and Pictures of the late Edgar Giberne. The auction took place on Saturday 14 December 1889.

When St. Martin's church in Epsom was extended in 1922, the new east window was dedicated to Edgar and three of his Buller relatives by marriage.

Works
Graves stated that Giberne's speciality was in domestic scenes, The Dictionary of Victorian Painters states that he painted figurative and genre subjects, the Dictionary of British Artists calls him a landscape painter, and The Meteor noted that he was especially fond of painting animals.

Edgar exhibited at the Royal Academy four times between 1877 and 1879. The Meteor, in his obituary, stated that the works he exhibited at the Academy proved him to be an artist of considerable promise. Graves shows him as exhibition only at the Royal Academy up to 1880 in the five principle venues in London. The Dictionary of British Artists show Giberne as exhibiting as follows from 1880:
 12 works at the Dudley Gallery and New Dudley Gallery
 Two works at the Walker Art Gallery, Liverpool
 One work at the Royal Society of British Artists
 Three works at the Royal Institute of Painters in Water Colours 
 One work at the Royal Institute of Oil Painters.

The Leeds Mercury said that of Giberne's "At Bay", which showed a "stag, which looks as if it had had a hard day over Exmoor, sheltering under a wooden bridge. The attitude of the poor driven creature, and the exultant rush of the hounds as they seem to recognise that the pursuit is over, are capitally rendered." Several of his paintings appeared on postcards by J Salmon Ltd.

Giberne worked as an illustrator, and had many illustrations in the illustrated journals. Houfe recorded that he had illustrations in the Illustrated London News.

Giberne illustrated a small number of books. The following list of works has developed largely from a search on the Jisc Library Hub Discover database.. Where necessary, missing details such as page counts and publisher's names have been filled in by searches on WorldCat and on newspaper archives.

Example of book illustration by Giberne
Illustration by Edgar Giberne (1850-1889) for Binko's blues: a tale for children of all growths (Chapman and Hall, London, 1884) by Herman Charles Merivale. By courtesy of the Internet Archive.

Notes

References

External links
 

1850 births
1889 deaths
19th-century British painters
English watercolourists
British male painters
English illustrators
British illustrators
British children's book illustrators
English children's book illustrators
Magazine illustrators
19th-century British male artists